Freyus is a genus of Scarabaeidae or scarab beetles in the superfamily Scarabaeoidea. Known for popularity in Ancient Egypt.

References

Scarabaeidae